In the Long Still Night is the third album by Gallon Drunk. It was released in 1996 through City Slang.

Track listing

Accolades

Personnel 
Gallon Drunk
Joe Byfield – maracas
Mike Delanian – bass guitar
Terry Edwards – saxophone, trumpet, organ, maracas
James Johnston – vocals, guitar, Wurlitzer electric piano, organ
Ian Watson – guitar, trumpet
Ian White – drums
Production and additional personnel
Denis Blackham – mastering
Bleddyn Butcher – photography
Gallon Drunk – production
Paul Kendall – production, mixing
Jem Noble – production, recording

References

External links 
 

1996 albums
Gallon Drunk albums
Albums produced by Paul Kendall
City Slang albums